Phrynobatrachus pygmaeus is a species of frog in the family Phrynobatrachidae. Common name Chad river frog has been coined for this species. This name presumably reflects the earlier assumption that the type locality was in Chad, into which the Ouham River flows.

Etymology
Presumably, this species is named for the Latin pygmaeus, meaning "dwarfish".

Taxonomy
Phrynobatrachus pygmaeus was described by German zoologist Ernst Ahl in 1925 based a single specimen, the holotype. However, the genus is currently considered a synonym of Phrynobatrachus.

Description
Phrynobatrachus pygmaeus has tympanum that is indistinct. Dorsal skin is warty and has two X-shaped ridges in the scapular region.

Ecology
There are no observations of this species after its discovery, and its ecology is essentially unknown.

References

pygmaeus
Frogs of Africa
Amphibians of the Central African Republic
Endemic fauna of the Central African Republic
Amphibians described in 1925
Taxa named by Ernst Ahl
Taxonomy articles created by Polbot